Merrill Russell "Merl" Combs (December 11, 1919 – July 7, 1981) was an American professional baseball player, scout and coach. Combs' active career spanned ten seasons (1941; 1946–1954). He was born in Los Angeles, and attended the University of Southern California.
 
In a five-season MLB career, Combs was a .202 hitter (73-for-361) with two home runs and 25 RBI in 140 games played, including 45 runs, six doubles and one triple.  Thereafter, he was a longtime scout for multiple Major League organizations, and spent one season, as a coach on the staff of the Texas Rangers.

Combs died of lung cancer in Riverside, California, at the age of 61.

References

External links

Retrosheet

1919 births
1981 deaths
Baseball players from Los Angeles
Boston Red Sox players
Cincinnati Reds scouts
Cleveland Indians players
Cleveland Indians scouts
Columbus Red Birds players
Deaths from lung cancer in California
Greensboro Red Sox players
Louisville Colonels (minor league) players
Major League Baseball shortstops
New York Mets scouts
Oakland Oaks (baseball) players
Philadelphia Phillies scouts
San Diego Padres (minor league) players
San Francisco Seals (baseball) players
Scranton Red Sox players
Seattle Rainiers players
Texas Rangers coaches
Toronto Maple Leafs (International League) players
USC Trojans baseball players
Washington Senators (1901–1960) players
John C. Fremont High School alumni